A hydraulic recoil mechanism is a way of limiting the effects of recoil and adding to the accuracy and firepower of an artillery piece.

Description 

The usual recoil system in modern quick-firing guns is the hydro-pneumatic recoil system.  In this system, the barrel is mounted on rails on which it can recoil to the rear, and the recoil is taken up by a cylinder which is similar in operation to an automotive gas-charged shock absorber, and is commonly visible as a cylinder mounted parallel to the barrel of the gun, but shorter and smaller than it.  The cylinder contains a charge of compressed air, as well as hydraulic oil; in operation, the barrel's energy is taken up in compressing the air as the barrel recoils backward, then is dissipated via hydraulic damping as the barrel returns forward to the firing position.  The recoil impulse is thus spread out over the time in which the barrel is compressing the air, rather than over the much narrower interval of time when the projectile is being fired.  This greatly reduces the peak force conveyed to the mount (or to the ground on which the gun has been emplaced).

See also
Canon de 75 modèle 1897#Hydro-pneumatic recoil mechanism, the first field gun employing a hydro-pneumatic recoil mechanism
List of British ordnance terms#Hydro-pneumatic

External links 
A "cutaway" animation of the Canon de 75 modèle 1897 showing the parts and operation of its revolutionary recoil mechanism

References 

Artillery components